Counthorpe is a hamlet in the civil parish of Counthorpe and Creeton in the  South Kesteven district of Lincolnshire, England.

In the Domesday account Counthorpe is written as "Cudetorp". Before the Conquest lordship was held by Earl Morcar; after, Drogo de la Beuvrière became Tenant-in-chief.

Counthorpe shares the Grade I listed Anglican parish church at Creeton, dedicated to St Peter. The church is of late Decorated style. A  restoration of 1851 discovered the arches and piers of a former Norman aisle. The church holds a chained bible from 1611. Two examples of Saxon crosses stand in the churchyard,  with 20 stone coffins considered to mark the interment of Cistercian monks of Vallis Dei abbey in the neighbouring parish of Edenham.

Counthorpe was formerly a hamlet of Castle Bytham and had, up to the 16th century, its own parochial chapel, but was annexed to Creeton in 1860.

Counthorpe is recorded in the 1872 White's Directory as a small village in the parish of Castle Bytham, but which, for ecclesiastical purposes, became on 30 June 1860 united with Creeton.

References

External links

"Creeton", Genuki.org.uk. Retrieved 20 July 2011

Hamlets in Lincolnshire
South Kesteven District